is the thirty-third single by B'z, released on June 5, 2002. This song is one of B'z many number-one singles in Oricon charts. The song was featured in the arcade drumming game Taiko no Tatsujin and also on the Nintendo DS rhythm game Osu! Tatakae! Ouendan.

Track listing

Personnel
 Tak Matsumoto - Electric guitar
 Koshi Inaba - Lead vocals
 Hideo Yamaki - Drums (on track 1)
 Shane Gaalaas - Drums (on track 2)
 Akihito Tokunaga - Bass (on tracks 1 and 3)
 Billy Sheehan - Bass (on track 2)
 Daisuke Ikeda - Arrangement

Certifications

References 
B'z performance at Oricon

External links 
 

2002 singles
B'z songs
Oricon Weekly number-one singles
Songs written by Tak Matsumoto
Songs written by Koshi Inaba
2002 songs